Coccoderma is a genus of prehistoric lobe-finned fish which lived during the Late Jurassic period, Kimmeridgian Stage. Fossils have been found in the USA. It was small in size, about 27.5 cm. They had very long and sharp teeth.

Species
 Coccoderma bavaricum REIS, 1888
 Coccoderma gigas REIS, 1888
 Coccoderma nudum REIS, 1888

References

The Paleobiology Database
Dinohunter
Fossil Museum

Prehistoric lobe-finned fish genera
Jurassic bony fish
Fossils of the United States